A sign is an entity which indicates another entity. 

Sign may also refer to:

Communication
Signage, the use of signs and visual graphics to convey information
Signature, a handwritten depiction of someone's name or other mark used as a proof of identity and intent
Sign (semiotics), anything that communicates a meaning
Sign language, a languages that uses the visual-manual modality to convey meaning

Mathematics
Sign (mathematics), an indication of negative and positive numbers
Sign function, also known as the signum function
Sign of a permutation of a finite set

Organizations
 Project Sign, a project by the U.S. Air Force to investigate unidentified flying objects (UFOs)
 Servicio de Inteligencia de la Gendarmería Nacional or Inteligencia de la Gendarmería Nacional Argentina, the Argentine intelligence service
 Scottish Intercollegiate Guideline Network, a Scottish group that develops evidence-based medical guidelines

Music
 Sign (band), an Icelandic band
 Sign (Clock DVA album), 1993
 "Sign" (Mr. Children song), 2004
 "Sign" (Beni Arashiro song), 2010
 "Sign" (Flow song), 2010
 "Sign", a 2018 song by Exo from Don't Mess Up My Tempo
 "Sign", a 2001 song by Marcella Detroit from Dancing Madly Sideways
 "Sign", a song by Susumu Hirasawa
 "Sign-2", a different version of "Sign" from Berserk: Millennium Falcon Hen Seima Senki no Shō
 Sign (Autechre album), 2020
 "The Sign" (song), a 1993 song by Ace of Base
 The Sign (Ace of Base album), a 1993 album by Ace of Base

Surname 

 Christopher Sign (19762021), American journalist

Other uses
 Astrological sign, one of twelve sectors of the sky in astrology
 Medical sign, an indication of disease, injury, or abnormal physiological state
 Sign (TV series), a 2011 South Korean television series

See also
 Signs (disambiguation)
 Signing (disambiguation)
 Sign-Trace
 Sine, a trigonometric function of an angle
 Sine (disambiguation)